The 1935 Texas Mines Miners football team was an American football team that represented Texas School of Mines (now known as the University of Texas at El Paso) as a member of the Border Conference during the 1935 college football season. In its seventh season under head coach Mack Saxon, the team compiled a 1–8 record (0–3 against Border Conference opponents), finished last in the conference, and was outscored by a total of 178 to 23.

Schedule

References

Texas Mines
UTEP Miners football seasons
Texas Mines Miners football